WRGC is an Adult contemporary/full service formatted broadcast radio station licensed to Sylva, North Carolina, serving Western North Carolina.  WRGC is owned and operated by Five Forty Broadcasting Company, LLC.

History

680 AM
Jimmy Childers and Asheville resident Harold Thomas signed on WMSJ in November 1957, operating in Sylva, North Carolina (Jackson county) on a frequency of 680 kHz. The letters of its callsign stood for "Macon/Swain/Jackson," Macon and Swain being the counties immediately south and west, respectively, of Jackson county.

The station's call sign was changed to WRGC in memory of Ronnie Childress, the former owner's son who was electrocuted while working on the transmitter during a thunderstorm in the 1970s (his initials were RGC).

WRGC broadcasts sports from Western Carolina University and Smoky Mountain High School, as well as local election results and weather. WRGC airs a "buy-sell-and-trade call-in show" called "Tradio."

Georgia-Carolina Radiocasting Company bought WRGC in 2002, changing the format from country and gospel to soft rock.

WRGC had about 8,000 listeners in Jackson, Macon and Swain Counties, though 98 percent of its advertising revenue came from Jackson County. The economic crisis hit the station hard, as several car dealers closed and other potential advertisers cut spending.

On August 31, 2011, the station turned off its transmitter. A posting on their website stated, "WRGC has left the air due to the severe economic conditions." The statement also addressed the permanency of this event, "Our long term plans for WRGC are not decided, but we have notified the Federal Communications Commission to go off the air until a decision is made." Art Sutton, president of Georgia-Carolina Radiocasting Company, hoped someone local could buy the station, because a local owner could "better develop relationships with those smaller businesses" needed to make a station successful, as his company's stations WNCC-FM and WFSC in nearby Franklin were.

540 AM
Roy Burnette of 540 Broadcasting Company announced plans to increase the signal of WRGC to 5,000 watts, with the help of a county loan of $289,000, for which a public hearing was planned for December 12, 2011. The stronger signal will likely attract more advertisers. Burnette said, "We want to offer in-depth service to Jackson, Macon, Swain and Haywood."

After test broadcasts on April 1, the new 540 AM WRGC officially signed on at 12:05 PM (on a new frequency of 540 kHz) with a welcoming statement by new owner, Roy Burnette, and the playing of the National Anthem (the Star Spangled Banner).  540 AM is a Canadian and Mexican clear-channel frequency.

References

External links
540 WRGC, The River Online

RGC (AM)
Full service radio stations in the United States